Amblyptilia landryi is a moth of the family Pterophoridae that is known from Honduras.

Adults are on wing in May.

Etymology
The species is named after Dr Bernard Landry, to honor his support of the studies of the Pterophoridae of the New World.

References

External links

Amblyptilia
Moths described in 2006
Endemic fauna of Honduras
Pterophoridae of South America
Moths of South America